Steven A. Osofsky is an American veterinarian.

Osofsky earned a bachelor's degree in biology from Harvard College and a Doctor of Veterinary Medicine from Cornell University. He teaches within the Department of Population Medicine and Diagnostic Sciences at Cornell's College of Veterinary Medicine, where he is the Jay Hyman Professor of Wildlife Health & Health Policy.

References

Cornell University faculty
Living people
American veterinarians
Cornell University College of Veterinary Medicine alumni
Harvard College alumni
Year of birth missing (living people)